Fahad Sheikh (born February 22, 1989) is a Pakistani actor and media personality. He rose to fame with the controversial ARY Television Network drama Jalan He was also seen in drama serial Dunk and drama serial Azmaish. Before Jalan he appeared in dramas such as Badbakht, Khudparast, and Bandish.

He was also seen in a short film "Nam Kya Rakha?" starring Hajra Yamin and Faizan Shaikh.

Career 
Actor Fahad shaikh stepped into media industry in 2011, with a roadshow 11 Number on style 360. He started his acting career in 2017, with Drama Serial Mubarik Ho Beti Hui Hai. Then he was seen in badbakht and khudparast. Later he appeared as hamza in ARY drama serial bandish. In 2020, he gained popularity through drama serial jalan playing the role of Ahmer Aziz. In 2021 he played major roles in drama Dunk and Azmaish.

Filmography

Television

Digital media

References

1982 births
Pakistani filmmakers
Living people
Pakistani male actors